Ducati Corse is the racing team division of Ducati Motor Holding S.p.A. that deals with the firm's involvement in motorcycle racing. It is directed by Claudio Domenicali and is based in Borgo Panigale, Bologna. 

More than one hundred people work in Ducati Corse (almost 10 percent of the Ducati Motor Holding S.p.A. workforce). Ducati Corse currently competes in MotoGP, the Superbike World Championship and other national championships.
Between 1998 and 2004 the racing division existed as a subsidiary company named Ducati Corse S.r.l., fully owned by Ducati Motor Holding. Ducati won MotoGP world championship title for both rider (Casey Stoner, Francesco Bagnaia) and constructor in 2007 and 2022, and two consecutive constructors' world championships in 2020 and 2021. In addition, Ducati has won multiple Superbike world championships, with Carl Fogarty (four titles) and Troy Bayliss (three titles) being the most successful riders.

Organization
The company is split into four departments.

Technical research and development
Technical research and development is composed of two teams responsible for the design and development of the motorcycles that compete in the MotoGP and Superbike championships.

Sporting activities
The sporting activities department is responsible for the factory teams that take part in the MotoGP and Superbike championships.

Commercial activities
The commercial activities department is responsible for providing private teams with motorcycles and spare parts. It also provides consultancy services and technical assistance to Ducati privateers take part in the Superbike World Championship and in national Superbike championships. From  Ducati Corse also supports a satellite team in MotoGP, supplying bikes and technical support.

Marketing and communication
The marketing and communication department's goal is to increase and manage the Ducati brand image in racing. It is also responsible for Ducati Corse official merchandising line.

Grand Prix motorcycle racing (MotoGP)

When the MotoGP technical rules changed in the  season, giving priority to four-stroke machinery, Ducati decided to enter Grand Prix motorcycle racing.

Ducati's MotoGP motorcycle was unveiled at the 2002 Italian GP at Mugello, for use in the 2003 MotoGP championship. Ducati began taking part in the MotoGP Championship in the  season and won one title in the  season. Ducati has collected 70 wins: 23 by Casey Stoner, 14 by Andrea Dovizioso, 11 by Francesco Bagnaia, 7 by Loris Capirossi, 4 by Enea Bastianini, 3 each by Jorge Lorenzo and Jack Miller, 2 by Danilo Petrucci, and 1 each by Troy Bayliss, Andrea Iannone and Jorge Martin.

Marlboro has been the title sponsor since 2003, although its name does not appear on the team's motorcycle.  This comes at a time when advertising of tobacco sponsorship has become illegal in the European Union and other major teams have withdrawn from relationships with tobacco companies, for example Yamaha ended their five-year relationship with Fortuna/Gauloises. The "controversial" team name associated with Marlboro's parent company, Philip Morris, was removed from the motorcycle livery for a May race event due to possible contravention of local advertising law, similarly it had been removed from Ferrari F1 race cars earlier in 2019.

2003
Troy Bayliss and Loris Capirossi competed in all rounds of the  MotoGP championship. Loris Capirossi, got a podium in the opening round of the championship in Japan and won the Catalan Grand Prix in Barcelona. Capirossi finished fourth in the final championship standings and Bayliss sixth; while Ducati finished second overall in the Manufacturers' standings.

2004
A large part of the  season went by before the bike became competitive, but the season concluded with both riders on the podium.

2005
In the  season, Bayliss was replaced by Spain's Carlos Checa and Ducati switched tyre suppliers to Bridgestone. Capirossi took two wins at Twin Ring Motegi and Sepang, while Checa scored a brace of podium finishes.

2006
Spanish rider Sete Gibernau replaced Checa for the  season. The team took its first win of 2006 in the opening round at Jerez, followed by a podium in Qatar. Capirossi led the championship for a short while, but at the start of the Catalan Grand Prix in Barcelona, Capirossi's bike collided with Gibernau's. Both riders ended up injured and in hospital, with Gibernau sustaining a broken collar bone. Capirossi struggled at the Dutch TT race a week later, while Gibernau was replaced by German Alex Hofmann for several rounds after undergoing additional surgery. With Gibernau also sidelined for the final round of the season at Valencia, Ducati recalled Bayliss, who was recently crowned Superbike World champion. Bayliss won the race, his first MotoGP victory, with Capirossi taking second place for the first Ducati 1–2 finish.

2007
Engine displacement was reduced to 800 cc for the  season. Ducati started development of its 800 cc motorcycle extremely early, and according to Ducati's racing chief Filippo Preziosi, by August 2006, Ducati had already built twenty 800 cc engines with various specifications. Loris Capirossi was joined in the team by Casey Stoner. During the most part of the 2007 season, Stoner dominated the field, obtaining his and the team's first MotoGP World Championship at Twin Ring Motegi on September 23, 2007, four races before the end of the season.

At the end of season, Ducati's chief engineer Alan Jenkins was awarded the Sir Jackie Stewart Award for brilliance throughout the season.

2008
Casey Stoner remained with the team and was partnered with Marco Melandri for the  season. Melandri had a difficult time adapting to the GP-8's performance, and mutually agreed to shorten his two-year contract to one year midway through the 2008 MotoGP season.

2009
Again, Casey Stoner remained with the team while Nicky Hayden became Stoner's new teammate on the factory Carbon Fibre chassis Ducati GP9, replacing Marco Melandri who moved to Kawasaki for the  season. Halfway through the season Finnish rookie Mika Kallio was given the chance to compete for the team for 3 races, as Stoner was unavailable due to illness.

2010
Once again Casey Stoner joined with Nicky Hayden for the  season.

2011
On 9 July 2010, Casey Stoner announced that he would join Honda Racing Corporation for the  season, after four years at Ducati.

On 15 August 2010, after the MotoGP Brno race, Valentino Rossi confirmed he would be riding for Ducati Corse, signing a two-year deal to start with the  season.

2012
Valentino Rossi and Nicky Hayden remained with Ducati Corse for the  season.

2013
Nicky Hayden remained with Ducati Corse for the 2013 season on a one-year contract. He was joined by Andrea Dovizioso.

2014
Andrea Dovizioso remained with Ducati for the 2014 season. He was joined by former team-mate Cal Crutchlow.

2015
Andrea Dovizioso remained with Ducati for the 2015 season with Andrea Iannone coming to the factory team from a Pramac Ducati. 2015 awaited the highly anticipated GP15, a full redesign of the Desmosedici by Gigi Dall'Igna which made its debut at the second February test in Sepang.

2016
Dovizioso and Iannone remained as the factory team riders for the 2016 season with the Desmo GP16, cited as being an evolution of the GP15. Perhaps the most notable change within Ducati Corse came with the arrival of Casey Stoner as the division's top test rider who immediately gelled with the Ducati, in addition to Michele Pirro. Ducati has fielded a total of 8 bikes on the MotoGP circuit for 2016 between the factory team, Pramac Yakhnich team, Aspar Team, and Avintia Racing.

2017
They have also retained Andrea Dovizioso, for a further two seasons.

2018
Once again Andrea Dovizioso joined with Jorge Lorenzo for the  season.

2019 
In 2019, after mainly poor results, Jorge Lorenzo's 2-year contract with Ducati ended with a move to Honda to join Marc Márquez, while Dovizioso remained. Italian rider Danilo Petrucci joined Ducati from Alma Pramac Racing.

2020 
Andrea Dovizioso's last year with the Ducati team ended with a victory in the 2020 Austrian motorcycle Grand Prix, while Danilo Petrucci won in the 2020 French motorcycle Grand Prix. 
Ducati won the Constructors' MotoGP World Championship for the second time.

2021 
Jack Miller and Francesco Bagnaia moved to this team. In the overall standings, Bagnaia secured second place.
Ducati won the Constructors' MotoGP World Championship for the third time,

2022 
Triple Crown for Ducati: the Bologna-based manufacturer wins the Constructors' Title, the Teams' Title for the Ducati Lenovo Team and the Riders' Title in MotoGP.

Grand Prix motorcycle results

By rider

By year

(key) (Races in bold indicate pole position; races in italics indicate fastest lap)

Notes

Superbike World Championship (SBK)

World Superbike history
Using V-twin engines Ducati was able to dominate the championship for many years. The  title was won by Doug Polen riding for the customer team managed by Eraldo Ferracci. From  to  Carl Fogarty won the title 4 times on Ducatis. Australian Troy Corser won the  title on a factory-spec Ducati fielded by Austrian team Promotor Racing.
In  Troy Bayliss won the first of his three titles.

In , the rule changes in MotoGP allowing 4-stroke engines meant that the Japanese manufacturers had focused their resources there, leaving the Superbike World Championship with limited factory involvement. Ducati Corse entered the only 2 Ducati 999s in the field, taking 20 wins from 24 races in a season where all races were won by Ducati. Neil Hodgson won the title on a Factory Ducati, while the team finished the season with 600 points, a record point score by a constructor in a season.  was a similar story, James Toseland winning the title although Ten Kate Honda's Chris Vermeulen prevented a Ducati clean-sweep.

 saw the return of Bayliss to the Superbike World Championship after 3 years in MotoGP. The combination of Bayliss and Ducati proved unstoppable and they dominated the season winning 12 races.

In , Troy Bayliss finished fourth riding once again a Ducati 999. Even though production of the 999 ended in 2006 and the bike was replaced by the Ducati 1098, Ducati produced 150 limited edition 999s to satisfy homologation requirements.

For , Ducati raced a homologated version of the 1098R. The FIM, the sanctioning body for the Superbike World Championship, raised the displacement limit for 2 cylinder engines to 1,200 cc. Bayliss won his third world championship and retired at the end of the 2008 season.

 saw Noriyuki Haga, who replaced Bayliss, partnered with Michel Fabrizio. Haga had a fantastic season on Ducati but lost the championship by 6 points; Haga ended the season as second while Fabrizio as third in overall championship standing.

Once again,  began with Noriyuki Haga partnering with Michel Fabrizio for Ducati in SBK.

On 27 August 2010, it was announced that Ducati SBK will no longer compete with a factory team in 2011, after 23 seasons which had brought the marque a total of 29 riders' and manufacturers' championship titles, instead limiting their participation to privateer teams running their works bikes.

During 2011-12 Ducati gave factory support to Althea Racing privateer team, winning the  title with Carlos Checa.
Having parted from Althea at the end of 2012, for  Ducati supported Francis Batta's Alstare Racing team introducing the new 1199 Panigale R in the world championship.

On 15 November 2013, it was announced that Ducati would be returning as a factory team in SBK as Ducati Superbike Team.

For  the returning factory team signed Chaz Davies and Davide Giugliano.

Davies was runner-up in 2015, 2017 and 2018, and third in 2016. Teammate Marco Melandri finished 4th in 2017 and 5th in 2018. The Italian was replaced by Álvaro Bautista in 2019. The Spaniard began the season with 11 consecutive wins, but later had mixed results.

By season results

(key) (Races in bold indicate pole position; races in italics indicate fastest lap)

WSSP results

* Season still in progress.

References

External links
 Ducati Corse website

Ducati (company)
Motorcycle racing teams
Motorcycle racing teams established in 1988
1988 establishments in Italy